The limestone rat (Niviventer hinpoon) is a species of rodent in the family Muridae found only in the limestone karsts of Saraburi, Lopburi, Nakhon Sawan provinces, central Thailand. It is listed as an endangered species due to its highly fragmented limestone karst habitat that is currently threatened by mining.

References

 Baillie, J. 1996.  Niviventer hinpoon.   2006 IUCN Red List of Threatened Species.   Downloaded on 19 July 2007.

Niviventer
Endemic fauna of Thailand
Rodents of Thailand
Mammals described in 1976
Near threatened biota of Asia
Taxonomy articles created by Polbot
Limestone